The 2013 Mnet Asian Music Awards took place on November 22, 2013, at AsiaWorld-Arena in Hong Kong. The ceremony was the fourth consecutive Mnet Asian Music Awards to occur outside of South Korea

Nominations were announced on October 23, 2013. Leading the nominees was Cho Yong-pil with six, followed by Psy, G-Dragon, and Girls' Generation with five nominations each. By the end of the ceremony, G-Dragon received the most wins with four awards, which includes the daesang (or grand prize) award "Artist of the Year

Background
This event marked the fifteenth Mnet Asian Music Awards. Using its slogan "Music Makes One" for the third consecutive time, MAMA was broadcast live in China, Japan, Hong Kong and Southeast Asia through various channels, as well as around the world.

This is the first time that the three daesang awards were presented separately. The first daesang, the song of the year award, was given at the end of the first block, the second daesang, the artist of the year award, was given at the end of the second block, and the third daesang, the album of the year award was given at the finale. After the last daesang award was given, Stevie Wonder performed. More than 10,000 people attended the ceremony.

Performers
The following individuals and groups, listed in order of appearance, performed musical numbers.

Presenters 

 Lee Seung-gi – Main host
 Sung Joon and Kim So-yeon – Presenters of  Best Dance Performance Award - Female Solo
 Ryan Seacrest (via VTR) – Introduced the nominees for Best Dance Performance Award - Female Group
 Sung Joon and Kim So-yeon – Presenters of  Best Dance Performance Award - Female Group
 Kim Jong-kook and Song Ji-hyo – Presenters of  NISSAN JUKE Best Music Video
 Lee Seung-chul – Presenter of the special award for Discovery of the Year
 Lee Soo-hyuk and Hong Jong-hyun – Presenters of  Best New Female Artist
 Lee Seo-jin – Introduced the recipients of Best Asian Artist Awards
 Paris Hilton – Presenter of the award for Best Male Artist
 Lee Bo-young and Jang Hyuk – Presenters of  BC UnionPay Song of the Year
 Dancing 9 – Presenters of  Best Dance Performance Award - Male Solo
 Yoo Se-yoon and Miriam Yeung – Best Vocal Performance - Female
 Cha Ye-ryun – Presenter of the special award for Style in Music
 Jung Woo and Go Ara – Presenters of the special award for Next Generation Global Star Female, Sony MDR Worldwide Performer
 Jay Park – Presenter of the award for International Favorite Artist
 Aaron Kwok and Han Chae-young – Presenters of  BC UnionPay Artist of the Year
 Kim Yoon-ah of Jaurim – Introduced performer Lee Seung-gi and presenter of the award for Best Vocal Performance - Male
 Lee Ha-neul – Presenter of the award for Best Rap Performance
 Lee Ha-neul and Dynamic Duo – Presenters of  Best Band Performance
 G-Dragon, Seungri, and Taeyang of Big Bang – Presenters of Music Makes One Global Ambassador Award
 Lee Dong-wook and Sung Yu-ri – Presenters of  Best Female Group, Best Male Group
 Song Ji-hyo – Introduced performers Big Bang
 Go Joon-hee – Presenter of the special award for Best Concert Performer
 Kim Ji-hoon and Han Ji-hye – Presenters of  Best Female Artist
 Go Soo – Presenter for the award for BC UnionPay Album of the Year
 Lee Seung-gi – Introduced performer Stevie Wonder

Winners and nominees

Winners are listed first and highlighted in boldface.

Special Awards
 Discovery of the Year: Baechigi
 Best Asian Artist: Derrick Hoh; Thu Minh; Tor Saksit; SM*SH; Kyary Pamyu Pamyu; Aaron Kwok
 Style in Music: Sistar
 Next Generation Global Star (Female): Apink
 Sony MDR Worldwide Performer: Infinite
 Best Concert Performer: Lee Seung-chul
 Music Makes One Global Ambassador Award: Stevie Wonder
 Red Carpet Special Prize: Lee Jung-hyun

Multiple awards

Artist(s) with multiple wins
The following artist(s) received two or more wins (excluding the special awards):

Artist(s) with multiple nominations
The following artist(s) received three or more nominations (excluding the special awards):

Broadcasts

References

External links
 Mnet Asian Music Awards  official website

MAMA Awards ceremonies
2013 in South Korean music
2013 in Hong Kong
2013 music awards